In enzymology, a CDP-ribitol ribitolphosphotransferase is an enzyme that catalyzes the chemical reaction

CDP-ribitol + (ribitol phosphate)n  CMP + (ribitol phosphate)n+1

Thus, the two substrates of this enzyme are CDP-ribitol and (ribitol phosphate)n, whereas its two products are CMP and (ribitol phosphate)n+1.

This enzyme belongs to the family of transferases, specifically those transferring non-standard substituted phosphate groups.  The systematic name of this enzyme class is CDP-ribitol:poly(ribitol phosphate) ribitolphosphotransferase. Other names in common use include teichoic-acid synthase, polyribitol phosphate synthetase, teichoate synthetase, poly(ribitol phosphate) synthetase, polyribitol phosphate polymerase, and teichoate synthase.

References

 

EC 2.7.8
Enzymes of unknown structure